The Chamber of Deputies, officially the Chamber of Deputies of the Parliament of the Czech Republic, is the lower house of the Parliament of the Czech Republic. The chamber has 200 seats and deputies are elected for four-year terms using the party-list proportional representation system with the D'Hondt method. Since 2002, there are 14constituencies, matching the Czech regions. A Cabinet is answerable to the Chamber of Deputies and the Prime Minister stays in office only as long as they retain the support of a majority of its members. The quorum is set by law to one third (67) of elected deputies. Any changes to the constitutional laws must be approved by at least 60 percent of the Chamber of Deputies. The seat of the Chamber of Deputies is the Thun Palace in Malá Strana, Prague.

Electability and mandate
Every citizen of the Czech Republic over 21 years old with the right to vote is eligible to be elected. The Deputy may not hold the office of Senator, President of the Czech Republic or judge, which also applies to certain positions specified by law. The office of the Deputy expires once:

 a Deputy-elect refuses to take the oath or takes it with reservation
 a Deputy's tenure expires
 a Deputy resigns from the office
 a Deputy loses eligibility to be elected
 a Deputy takes up an office incompatible with serving as a Deputy.
 the Chamber of Deputies is dissolved

Dissolution

After a dissolution of the Chamber of Deputies, new elections must be held within 60 days, and the Chamber cannot be dissolved within three months of regular elections. The Chamber of Deputies can only be dissolved by the president under conditions specified by the constitution. The Chamber of Deputies is most commonly dissolved following two votes of no confidence in the cabinet. During a dissolution of the Chamber of Deputies, the Senate has the authority to take necessary legal measures in its place.

Seat of the Chamber of Deputies

The Chamber of Deputies resides in three building complexes in Malá Strana, Prague. The main building with the plenary chamber is the Thun Palace, built at the end of the 17th century. It was rebuilt at the start of the 19th century to house the Bohemian Diet. The current plenary chamber was built in 1861 for the reinstated Bohemian Diet after it was dissolved by the Austrian-Hungarian Emperor Franz Joseph I in 1849. The second building was the seat of the Governors of the Kingdom of Bohemia appointed by the emperor, located on Malá Strana Square. The last building complex includes the Smiřický Palace and Šternberk Palace at the opposite side of the square.

Past Chamber of Deputies election results

As part of the democratic Czechoslovakia 

During this time the Chamber of Deputies was called the National Council.

See also
 List of presidents of the Chamber of Deputies (Czech Republic)
 List of MPs elected in the 2021 Czech legislative election
 List of MPs elected in the 2017 Czech legislative election
 List of MPs elected in the 2013 Czech legislative election
 List of MPs elected in the 2010 Czech legislative election
 List of MPs elected in the 2006 Czech legislative election
 List of MPs elected in the 2002 Czech legislative election
 List of MPs elected in the 1998 Czech legislative election
 List of MPs elected in the 1996 Czech legislative election

References

Further reading
 Kolář, Petr, and Petr Valenta. The Parliament of the Czech Republic – the Chamber of Deputies. Prague : Published for the Office of the Chamber of Deputies of the Parliament of the Czech Republic by Ivan Král, 2009.

External links
  
  

 
Parliament of the Czech Republic
Czech Republic, Chamber of Deputies of the
1993 establishments in the Czech Republic